The Ngebedech Terraces, or Ouballang ra Ngebedech, are located in the southwestern part of Babeldaob, the largest island in Palau.

Site description
The area covers over 160,000 sq m of grassland savannah in upland Babeldaob.  The terraces performed multiple functions that include, according to UNESCO, "agriculture, settlement, defense, and ceremonial functions."  Morgan (1988) argues that these terraces might be linked into larger more extended systems of complex topography.

World Heritage Status

Notes

References
Ouballang ra Ngebedech (Ngebedech Terraces) - UNESCO World Heritage Centre Retrieved 2009-03-03.

Morgan, W.N. (1988), Prehistoric Architecture in Micronesia, University of Texas Press. 

Geography of Palau
Architecture in Palau